Kelly Pratt may refer to:
Kelly Pratt (ice hockey) (born 1953), ice hockey player
Kelly Pratt (musician), multi-instrumentalist and member of the bands Beirut and Arcade Fire